WHN may refer to:

 WHN, a former New York City radio station
 Whiston railway station (National Rail station code), England
 Wuhan railway station, China Railway telegraph code WHN